Metropolitan Macarius (born Mikhail Petrovich Bulgakov, ; –), was the Metropolitan of Moscow and Kolomna in 1879–82 and member of many learned societies, including the Russian Academy of Sciences.

In 1841, he graduated from the Kiev Theological Academy, of which he served as a dean in 1851–57. His popular student manual, Orthodox Dogmatic Theology, steeped in the Latin methodology, was originally printed in 6 volumes in 1847–53. In 1866 Macarius started the publication of his landmark History of the Russian Church, for which he is best remembered. The 12th volume of his magnum opus, covering the patriarchate of Nikon, was released posthumously.

Macarius has been considered one of the three major church historians of the Russian Empire, along with Filaret Gumilevsky and Yevgeny Golubinsky.

Of Tatar descent, he was a distant relative of the major Eastern Orthodox theologian Sergei Bulgakov.

References

External links
 Mitropolitan Macarius, History of Russian Church 

1816 births
1882 deaths
People from Shebekinsky District
People from Novooskolsky Uyezd
Russian people of Tatar descent
Metropolitans and Patriarchs of Moscow
Historians of the Russian Orthodox Church
Russian theologians
Russian historians of religion
Eastern Orthodox theologians
19th-century Eastern Orthodox bishops
19th-century Eastern Orthodox theologians
Kiev Theological Academy alumni
Full members of the Saint Petersburg Academy of Sciences
Demidov Prize laureates
Recipients of the Order of St. Vladimir, 1st class